Parastenella may refer to:
 Parastenella (coral), a genus of corals in the family Primnoidae
 Parastenella (fungus), a genus of funguses in the division Ascomycota, family unassigned